The Universidad Argentina John F. Kennedy (John F. Kennedy Argentine University) was founded by Miguel Herrera Figueroa, JD, on April 4, 1964, in Buenos Aires, Argentina. The university has 18 units in the City of Buenos Aires and two in Buenos Aires Province. In 2008, it had 39 academic departments and a students department, where activities related to sports are developed with the Kennedy Choir and the Theater Workshop.

Schools 
Law
Architecture
Biochemistry
Accounting
Pharmacy
Licenciatura in Business Administration
Licenciatura in Hotel Administration
Licenciatura in Drama
Licenciatura in Political Science
Licenciatura in Education Sciences
Licenciatura in Marketing
Licenciatura in International Trade
Licenciatura in Demography and Tourism
Licenciatura in Graphic Design
Licenciatura in Journalism and Communication
Licenciatura in Psychology
Teacher Training in Psycho-pedagogy
Licenciatura in Psycho-pedagogy
Licenciatura in Publicity
Licenciatura in Chemistry
Licenciatura in International Relations
Licenciatura in Labor Relations
Licenciatura in Public Relations
Social Worker
Licenciatura in Social Work
Systems Analyst
Licenciatura in Systems
Licenciatura in Sociology
Odontology
Agent for Judicial Matters
Teacher Training in Computer Studies
Teacher Training in Education Sciences
University Teacher Training Program
On line Education

N.B. Under the Argentine education system, a Licenciatura is equivalent to a B.S. or a B.A. degree.

Graduate degrees 
Doctorate in Law
Doctorate in Social Psychology
Major in Criminal Sciences
Major in Clinical Psychology
Major in Orthodontics
Master in Psychoanalysis

See also
 List of memorials to John F. Kennedy

References

External links
 Website of the Universidad Argentina John F. Kennedy

Educational institutions established in 1964
Education in Buenos Aires
Kennedy, John F.
Universities in Buenos Aires Province
1964 establishments in Argentina